Live at Ronnie Scott's is a live long-form video by British recording artist Lisa Stansfield. It was released in July and August 2005 in Europe. The DVD captures Stansfield's weeklong sold-out residency at the Ronnie Scott's Jazz Club in London in 2002.

It documents her critically acclaimed performance on the stage that has become home to some of the most famous and talented names in the music business over the past fifty years. Stansfield performed a mix of jazz favourites, along with some of her greatest hits. "That was hard work but I'd like to do more intimate performances like that," Stansfield said. "You're up close and personal to the audience and so it's very real."

Track listing

Release history

References

Lisa Stansfield albums
Live video albums
2005 video albums
Albums recorded at Ronnie Scott's Jazz Club